Esmeralda de Jesus Freitas Garcia Silami (born February 16, 1959) is a retired long and triple jumper from Brazil, who also competed in the sprint events. A two-time Olympian she is best known for setting the (non-ratified) world record in the women's triple jump on June 5, 1986, in Indianapolis: 13.68 metres.

Achievements

References
 
 

1959 births
Living people
Brazilian female triple jumpers
Brazilian female long jumpers
Brazilian female sprinters
Athletes (track and field) at the 1976 Summer Olympics
Athletes (track and field) at the 1984 Summer Olympics
Olympic athletes of Brazil
Athletes (track and field) at the 1983 Pan American Games
Pan American Games gold medalists for Brazil
Pan American Games medalists in athletics (track and field)
World record setters in athletics (track and field)
Medalists at the 1983 Pan American Games
20th-century Brazilian women